Fiu or FIU may refer to:

 Florida International University
 Fighter Interception Unit, of the Royal Air Force
 Financial intelligence unit
 Finno-Ugric languages, with ISO code "fiu"
 Free International University, a defunct German artistic organization
 Kwara'ae language, also called Fiu